Tung Shing is a Chinese divination guide and almanac.  It consists primarily of a calendar based on the Chinese lunar year.

History
Tung Shing originated from Wong Lik (the "Yellow Calendar"), which legend attributes to the Yellow Emperor. It has changed its form numerous times throughout the years during all the dynasties; the latest version was said to have been edited under the Qing dynasty and was called the Tung Shu. Tung means "all", Shu means "book", so Tung Shu literally meant "All-knowing Book".  However, in Cantonese Chinese and Mandarin Chinese, the pronunciation of the word for "book" is a homophone of a word for defeated, so Tung Shu sounded like "Defeated in All Things". Therefore, the name was changed to Tung Shing, which means "Victorious in All Things".

Contents
Most of the contents of the book deals with what is suitable to do on each day.  Some Chinese families still follow these days for wedding ceremonies, funerals, etc.

Tung Shing is also used by many fung shui practitioners and destiny diviners to complement other date selection methods for selecting dates and times for important events like marriages, official opening ceremonies, house moving-in and big contract signings, as well as smaller events like time to start renovations or travel.

The most common use of Tung Shing is in choosing a wedding date. Tung Shing contains information on the auspicious and inauspicious days for weddings and/or engagements. In addition, it provides the auspicious timing in which to carry out such activities.

Tung Shing also provide a conversion of years and date between the lunar year and the common year. In more detailed versions, the calendar will list eclipses (both solar and lunar), the start of each season, and days when it will be cold or hot.  It also teaches ethics and values through stories.

Tung Shing sold in Hong Kong, Macau and Taiwan are based on two late-Qing versions. It is known for its English definitions and words transliterated into Cantonese characters.

Gallery

Other specialties
 Interpret one's fate
 Measure one's soul weight (requires Four Pillars of Destiny)
 Face reading and palm reading charts
 "For many centuries the T'ung Shu was known as the Farmers' Almanac, and most of its practical information was geared to weather, crops, sowing, harvesting and so forth."

See also
 Chinese astrology
 Da Liu Ren (大六壬)
 Fuji (planchette writing)
 Fulu
 I Ching divination
 Lingqijing
 Kau Cim
 Qi Men Dun Jia (奇門遁甲)
 Shaobing Song
 Tai Sui
 Tai Yi Shen Shu (太乙神數)
 Tangki
 Tui bei tu
 Wen Wang Gua

References

 
 
  Includes list of chapters

External links
 Online Tung shing 
 List of Auspicious Wedding dates from the 2010 Tung Shu
T'ung Shu 1986 at Library Thing
T'ung Shu 1986 at Open Library
T'ung Shu 2001 at Open Library

Almanacs
Chinese calendars